"Greece 2000" is a song by Dutch progressive trance duo Three Drives. It peaked at number 12 in the United Kingdom and number-one on the UK Dance chart.

Track listing
12" Maxi Single - 1997
 "Greece 2000" - 8:03	
 "Not Overdrive" - 7:06	
 "Piano Freq." - 6:10

 WHITENO1SE Remix - 2019
 "Greece 2000" (WHITENO1SE Extended Remix) - 4:13

Charts

References

1997 singles
1997 songs